The following article was a summary of the 2020 football season in Indonesia, which was the 22nd competitive season in its history. All of domestic competitions were cancelled due to COVID-19 pandemic.

Domestic leagues

Promotion and relegation 

Promoted to Liga 1
 Persik
 Persita
 Persiraja

Promoted to Liga 2
 Persijap
 PSKC
 Tiga Naga
 Persekat
 Putra Sinar Giri
 Hizbul Wathan (formerly Semeru)

Relegated to Liga 2
 Badak Lampung
 Semen Padang
 Kalteng Putra

Relegated to Liga 3
 PSGC
 Persibat
 Bandung United
 Madura
 Persatu
 PSMP

Name changes 
 Semeru relocated to Sidoarjo and were renamed to Hizbul Wathan.

Liga 1 

The season was abandoned and declared void on 20 January 2021.

Liga 2 

The season was abandoned and declared void on 20 January 2021.

Liga 3 

The season was abandoned and declared void on 20 January 2021.

Domestic cups

Piala Indonesia 

The tournament was cancelled.

International club competitions

AFC Champions League 

The 2020 AFC Champions League began on 14 January and was scheduled to end on 28 November 2020. But due to the coronavirus pandemic, the AFC Champions League competition is scheduled to finish on 5 December 2020 with the revised schedule released on 9 July 2020. Bali United were representing Indonesia in the competition, having won the 2019 Liga 1.

Bali United

AFC Cup 

The 2020 AFC Cup began on 21 January and was scheduled to end on 7 November 2020. But due to the coronavirus pandemic, the AFC Cup competition is scheduled to finish on 12 December 2020 with the revised schedule released on 9 July 2020. PSM were representing Indonesia in the competition, having won the 2018–19 Piala Indonesia. Bali United were also representing Indonesia in the competition after failed to qualify for AFC Champions League group stage. The season was abandoned on 10 September and was declared void the following day due to the COVID-19 pandemic in Asia.

PSM

Bali United

National teams

Men's senior

Friendlies 
The following is a list of friendlies (to be) played by the men's senior national team in 2020.

Men's under-19

Friendlies 
The following is a list of friendlies (to be) played by the men's under-19 national team in 2020.

Men's under-16

Friendlies 
The following is a list of friendlies (to be) played by the men's under-16 national team in 2020.

References